Jean-Philippe Wispelaere is a former intelligence analyst for the Australian Defence Intelligence Organisation. He was convicted of attempting to sell United States military secrets to a foreign country in 1999.

Wispelaere began his work at the DIO in July 1998, and had access to data which was provided to the DIO through Australia's treaties with the United States. In January the following year, Wispelaere quit his job and travelled to Bangkok, where he approached the embassy of a foreign country, offering to sell classified material to that country. (The country is reported by some sources to be Singapore). The country notified the United States, and the FBI began to investigate. Posing as agents for a foreign country (allegedly Russia), the FBI met Wispelaere in Bangkok, where he gave them hundreds of sensitive documents in exchange for cash. Later, he mailed more documents to an address in Virginia, also run by the FBI.

On 15 May, Wispelaere was lured to Washington, where he expected to meet the foreign agent. He was arrested by the FBI at Dulles International Airport, and was charged with attempted espionage. Under a plea bargain agreement, Wispelaere agreed to co-operate with investigators in exchange for a lighter penalty. He was sentenced to fifteen years in prison. He is alleged to suffer from mental illness, and his trial was delayed to claims he was suffering from schizophrenia.

In May 2009 Attorney-General Robert McClelland granted preliminary approval for Wispelaere to return to Australia under the international prisoner transfer scheme.

Notes

External links
Australian Broadcasting Corporation news report (radion transcript)
Association of Former Intelligence Officers - Weekly Intelligence Notes #24-01

Living people
Australian spies
Australian people imprisoned abroad
Prisoners and detainees of the United States federal government
Year of birth missing (living people)